Bestiary is the second and final studio album by American hip hop group Hail Mary Mallon. The album was released on November 10, 2014, by Rhymesayers Entertainment.

Critical reception

David Jeffries of AllMusic says Aesop Rock and Rob Sonic "have a perfect chemistry: Rock makes it all seem vital while Sonic makes it all sound easy". He goes on to note that "Rock and Sonic handle all the production, block-rocking and electro-boogieing with the old-school in mind."

Track listing

Charts

References

External links
 

2014 albums
Hail Mary Mallon albums
Rhymesayers Entertainment albums
Albums produced by Aesop Rock